Fibla is a genus of snakeflies belonging to the family Inocelliidae.

The species of this genus are found in Europe and Northern America.

Species
GBIF lists:

†Fibla carpenteri 
Fibla cerdanica 
Fibla erigena 
Fibla exusta 
Fibla hesperica 
Fibla maclachlani 
Fibla pasiphae 
Fibla peyerimhoffi

References

Raphidioptera
Insect genera